36 Crazy Fists may refer to:

The 36 Crazy Fists, a 1977 martial arts movie
36 Crazyfists, an American rock band